Adocus is an extinct genus of aquatic turtles belonging to the family Adocidae. Adocus was once considered to belong to the family Dermatemyidae.

Description
Species of the genus Adocus had flattened and smoothly contoured shells with horny sculptured plates. The shells could reach a length of about 80 cm. These large freshwater turtles had an omnivorous diet. They lived from the Late Cretaceous to the Paleocene in North America, but in Asia, they were also present during the Oligocene.

Distribution
These turtles have been found in Cretaceous to Paleogene of Canada, United States, Mongolia, China, Japan, Kazakhstan, Tajikistan, and Uzbekistan.

Species
 Adocus agilis
 Adocus aksary
 Adocus beatus, type species (synonyms: A. punctatus, A. lacer)
 Adocus bossi
 Adocus bostobensis
 Adocus dzhurtasensis
 Adocus firmus
 Adocus foveatus
 Adocus hesperius
 Adocus kirtlandius
 Adocus kizylkumensis
 Adocus kohaku
 Adocus lineolatus
 Adocus onerosus
 Adocus orientalis
 Adocus pravus
 Adocus sengokuensis
 Adocus syntheticus

References

The Paleobiology Database
Paleocene Mammals
Recently Collected Specimen of Adocus
E.V. Syromyatnikova and I.G. Danilov 
Yale Digital Content

Prehistoric turtles of Asia
Early Cretaceous genus first appearances
Rupelian genus extinctions
Paleocene turtles
Trionychia
Cretaceous turtles of North America
Hell Creek fauna
Eocene turtles
Cenozoic turtles of North America
Laramie Formation
Extinct turtles